George Byron Lyon-Fellowes (1815–1876) was a mayor of Ottawa in 1876. He also represented Russell County in the Legislative Assembly of the Province of Canada from 1848 to 1861.

He was born George Byron Lyon at Sorel, Quebec in 1815, the son of George Lyon, a captain in the British army.  He later adopted his wife's surname Fellowes. He studied law.  His younger brother, Robert Lyon was also mayor of Ottawa.

He died while in office in 1876.

References

 

1815 births
1876 deaths
People from Sorel-Tracy
Members of the Legislative Assembly of the Province of Canada from Canada West
Mayors of Ottawa
Canadian people of Scottish descent
Anglophone Quebec people